Randy John Read  (born 9 June 1957) is a Wellcome Trust Principal Research Fellow and professor of protein crystallography at the University of Cambridge.

Education
Read was educated at the University of Alberta in Edmonton, Canada where he was awarded a Bachelor of Science degree in 1979 followed by a PhD in 1986 for X-ray crystallography of serine proteases and their protein inhibitors supervised by Michael N. G. James.

Career and research
Following his PhD, Read was appointed assistant professor from 1988 to 1993 and associate professor from 1993 to 1998 at the University of Alberta. , Read's research interests are in protein crystallography and maximum likelihood estimation. His research has been published in leading peer reviewed scientific journals including Nature, Science, the Journal of Applied Crystallography Acta Crystallographica, Structure, PNAS, the Journal of Molecular Biology and the Journal of Clinical Endocrinology and Metabolism.

Awards and honours
Read was elected Fellow of the Royal Society (FRS) in 2014. His nomination reads:

References

1957 births
Living people
Canadian crystallographers
Fellows of the Royal Society
University of Alberta alumni
British crystallographers
Academic staff of the University of Alberta
Academics of the University of Cambridge
Canadian Fellows of the Royal Society